David Charles Law (born c.1930), is a male former athlete who competed for England.

Athletics career
He represented England in the 880 yards and 1 mile at the 1954 British Empire and Commonwealth Games in Vancouver, Canada.

References

1930 births
English male middle-distance runners
Athletes (track and field) at the 1954 British Empire and Commonwealth Games
Living people
Commonwealth Games competitors for England